The CANUSA Games are an annual contest, primarily for athletes age 18 and under, between the sister cities of Hamilton, Ontario, Canada, and Flint, Michigan, United States. The Games are the longest-running amateur sports competition in North America. The games are held in alternate locations, with Hamilton, Ontario, hosting in odd-numbered years.

History
As a result of the Flint Olympian Games held in Flint, Michigan, in July 1957, the Flint officials of the Games wanted a city, of similar size and population, to compete with on a yearly basis.  Hamilton was selected, which birthed the "CANUSA" games, whose name was derived from combining the names Canada and United States - CAN/USA.

The Games began in August 1958, and consisted of 200 athletes (from each city) competing in seven different sports. The Games have grown considerably, which is supported by the more than 1,600 athletes from each city competing in 17 different competitive sports, including basketball, baseball, softball, volleyball, darts, golf, track and field, swimming and ice hockey. An estimated 25,000 people have participated in the games in their 50 years.

Opening Ceremonies
The Opening Ceremonies of the CANUSA Games are arguably the most highlighted piece of the weekend.  One of these highlights is most certainly the running relay which covers the distance between Flint and Hamilton - 245 miles.  Departing the night before from the visiting city, relay runners carry the torch over the border, which is one of the longest international runs in all of North America.  The torch is run into the venue in which the opening ceremonies are held, which represents the official start of the Games.

To symbolize the relationship between the sister cities, the national anthems (from both nations) are sung by everyone present at the Opening Ceremonies.  The Friendship Trophy is also given by the Mayor of the host city to the Mayor of the visiting city as a symbol of friendship and peace. The Games take the true meaning of friendship to task as each year the visiting country's athletes "billet" or reside with their counterparts during the entire weekend beyond competition. It is considered the signature of the Game's existence.

Editions

References

Canada–United States relations
Multi-sport events in Canada
Multi-sport events in the United States
North American international sports competitions
Recurring sporting events established in 1958
Sport in Hamilton, Ontario
Sports in Flint, Michigan
Tourist attractions in Genesee County, Michigan